Cyril Cartwright (28 January 1924 – 29 September 2015) was a British cyclist who held national records on the track and on the road and came second in the world amateur pursuit championship in Copenhagen in 1949. He held the British five-mile and 30-mile records.

Cyril Cartwright was a miner in the Dukinfield area of England. He won the national 25-mile time trial championship in 1948, one of the first riders in the country to beat one hour for the distance. He set a national record at 59m 18s. He won the British Empire Games (Now called the Commonwealth Games) 4,000m pursuit in Auckland, New Zealand, in 1950, beating the future Tour de France rider, Russell Mockridge. The ship journey to New Zealand took five weeks. Cartwright got in as many miles as he could before the ship left in January, including riding from Manchester to London and back over a weekend. He took 13 hours on the southbound journey, 11 hours going north. He said:

Of his ride against Mockridge, he said:

By three-quarter distance, Mockridge was struggling so badly that he gave up when he was 50 yards behind. As well as the gold medal, Cartwright received a certificate for the fastest time ridden in New Zealand.

Cartwright remembered: "As we boarded his ship [for the journey home], the captain didn't say 'Congratulations, nice work.' His words were: 'I've locked those rollers of yours in the hold for the voyage home. You were nothing but a nuisance on the way here but we don't want to have to put up with it on the way back.".

He stopped racing after not being selected for the Olympic Games in Helsinki in 1952.

References 

English male cyclists
Cyclists at the 1950 British Empire Games
Commonwealth Games gold medallists for England
People from Dukinfield
1924 births
2015 deaths
Commonwealth Games medallists in cycling
Medallists at the 1950 British Empire Games